, better known as , is a Japanese comedian who is represented by the talent agency, Yoshimoto Kogyo.

Asaka was a resident in Kita-ku, Sakai, Osaka Prefecture. She is also an actress for Yoshimoto Shinkigeki.

Filmography

TV Series

Advertisements

References

External links
 Official profile 

Japanese comedians
1956 births
Living people
People from Ōita Prefecture